is a Japanese women's professional shogi player ranked 2-dan.  she is serving as an executive director of Ladies Professional Shogi-players' Association of Japan (LPSA).

Women's shogi professional

Promotion history
Shimai's promotion history is as follows:
 Women's Professional Apprentice League: April 1995
 2-kyū: April 1, 1996
 1-kyū: April 1, 2001
 1-dan: April 1, 2003
 2-dan: January 16, 2012

Note: All ranks are women's professional ranks.

LPSA director
Shimai was chosen to be a director of the LPSA  for the first time in February 2014, and reelected to the same post in February 2016. In February 2018, she was chosen to be one of the organization's two executive directors. She was reelected as an executive director in 2020 and 2022.

Personal life
Shimai is married to professional shogi player Hiroaki Yokoyama. The couple married in July 2011.

References

Japanese shogi players
Living people
Women's professional shogi players
LPSA
Professional shogi players from Kōchi Prefecture
People from Kōchi Prefecture
1980 births